The 134th Fighter Squadron (134th FS), nicknamed the Green Mountain Boys, is a unit of the Vermont Air National Guard 158th Fighter Wing located at Burlington Air National Guard Base, Burlington, Vermont. From 1986 to 2019, the 134th FS were equipped with the General Dynamics F-16C/D Fighting Falcon Block 30. The last F-16s departed Burlington on 6 April 2019 in preparation for the Lockheed Martin F-35A Lightning II which arrived on 19 September 2019. Since becoming an F-35A unit, the Green Mountain Boys are tasked with carrying out the Suppression of Enemy Air Defenses (SEAD).

A 134th Observation Squadron was active at Ethan Allen Army Airfield, Fort Ethan Allen , Burlington, Vermont as a Vermont National Guard reconnaissance unit for the United States Army 7th Field Artillery Regiment in 1921-27, but does not officially share the current squadron's lineage. The current unit officially traces its history to the 384th Bombardment Squadron (Light), activated in March 1942. The redesignated 134th Fighter Squadron, allocated to the Vermont ANG, has been flying fighters since 1946, though with a short exception as a Defense Systems Evaluation Squadron between 1974 and 1982.

History

The 134th Observation Squadron was constituted in the National Guard in 1921 as the 134th Squadron (Observation) and assigned to the III Corps. Placed on the deferred list on 2 July 1923 and transferred to the Organized Reserve as a Deferred National Guard unit. Concurrently re-designated as the 553rd Observation Squadron and assigned to the 328th Observation Group (III Corps). Withdrawn from allotment to the National Guard and the Third Corps Area on 17 September 1927 and demobilized.

Although this unit trained near the current Burlington International Airport, and shares the same numerical designation as the 134th Fighter Squadron, the unit was never consolidated with the 134th Fighter Squadron by the Air Force Historical Research Agency or the National Guard Bureau and does not share any lineage or history with the current Vermont Air National Guard.

World War II
Trained with V-72 Vengeance aircraft. Moved to India, via Australia, July–September 1943. Assigned to Tenth Air Force. Operating from India and using A-36A Apaches. The 530th Fighter Squadron having its diagonal bands sloping from top right to bottom left. The red nose was also a squadron marking. Many planes of the squadron had a girl's name on the nose but very few had any artwork.

The squadron supported Allied ground forces in northern Burma; covered bombers that attacked Rangoon, Insein, and other targets; bombed enemy airfields at Myitkyina and Bhamo; and conducted patrol and reconnaissance missions to help protect transport planes that flew The Hump route between India and China.

Converted to P-51C Mustangs in May 1944. Moved to Burma in July and continued to support ground forces, including Merrill's Marauders; also flew numerous sweeps over enemy airfields in central and southern Burma.

Moved to China in August 1944 and assigned to Fourteenth Air Force. Escorted bombers, flew interception missions, struck the enemy's communications, and supported ground operations, serving in combat until the end of the war. Ferried P-51's from India for Chinese Air Force in November 1945. Returned to the U.S. in December 1945.

Inactivated in early 1946.

Vermont Air National Guard
The wartime 530th Fighter Squadron was re-designated as the 134th Fighter Squadron, and was allotted to the Vermont Air National Guard, on 24 May 1946. It was organized at the Burlington International Airport, Vermont, and was extended federal recognition on 14 August 1946 by the National Guard Bureau.

The 134th was the fifth Air National Guard unit to be formed and federally recognized.  The organizers of the squadron were MG Murdock Campbell, the Adjutant General, Col Albert Cate, Air Advisor, and LtCol William M. Bowden became the first commander of the newly formed unit.  The 134th Fighter Squadron was bestowed the lineage, history, honors, and colors of the 530th Fighter Squadron and all predecessor units. 

The 134th was equipped with F-47D Thunderbolts and was assigned initially directly to the Vermont Air National Guard until the Massachusetts ANG 67th Fighter Wing, was federally recognized on 15 October 1946.  The 67th Fighter Wing was the first ANG command and control organization in New England.   On 4 April 1947, it was transferred to the Maine ANG 101st Fighter Group.

In 1950, the Thunderbolts were replaced by F-51H Mustangs.

Air Defense Command
The mission of the 134th Fighter Squadron was the air defense of Vermont. With the surprise invasion of South Korea on 25 June 1950, and the regular military's complete lack of readiness, most of the Air National Guard was federalized – placed on active duty.  The 134th was federalized on 10 February 1951 and assigned to the federalized Maine ANG 101st Fighter-Interceptor Wing, although it initially remained stationed at Burlington Airport.  When federalized, it was composed of F-51 aircraft and later assigned F-86D aircraft.   Its mission was expanded to include the air defense of New England.   The squadron was then attached to the Air Defense Command 23d Fighter-Interceptor Wing at Presque Isle AFB, Maine on 1 April 1951 with no change of mission.   It was reassigned to the 4711th Defense Wing on 6 February 1952 at Presque Isle AFB.  It was released from active duty and returned to control of State of Vermont on 1 November 1952.

With the end of the Korean War, Air Defense Command assigned the 517th Air Defense Group as the host unit, and the Vermont Air National Guard began operating out of the old airport administration building and the wooden hangar next to it, receiving its first T-33 Shooting Star and assigned to the 101st Fighter-Interceptor Group. Burlington Airport became a joint-use facility as the United States Air Force Ethan Allen Air Force Base was established at the airport on 16 February 1953.

With the increased availability of jet aircraft after the Korean War, the squadron's aircraft were upgraded to the F-94 Starfire on 16 June 1953.  With the 101st FIG consisting of Maine, New Hampshire, and Vermont Air Guard units, the group began holding summer camp at Otis Air Force Base after they began flying F-94s.  On 1 May 1956 the 134th was authorized to expand to a group level, and the 158th Fighter Group (Air Defense) was established by the National Guard Bureau; the 134th FIS becoming the group's flying squadron. Other squadrons assigned into the group were the 158th Headquarters, 158th Material Squadron (Maintenance), 158th Combat Support Squadron, and the 158th USAF Dispensary. 

On 25 June 1960, Air Defense Command inactivated the 14th Fighter Group at Ethan Allen AFB, and the base reverted to full Air National Guard jurisdiction.   The 158th Fighter Group now manned alert hangars 24 hours a day. In the summer of 1960, summer field training was conducted at Otis Air Force Base at Cape Cod, MA, from 18 June to 2 July. When the unit returned to Burlington, the Maintenance and Operations Squadrons immediately moved into the facilities that had been vacated by the Regular Air Force with the closure of Ethan Allen AFB.  The aging F-94s were replaced by twin-engine F-89D Scorpion fighters in 1958. Two years later F-89Js replaced the D models. The J model was designed to carry two AIR-2 Genie nuclear-tipped air-to-air missiles under the wings to defend against enemy bomber attack.

The 134th was reorganized as the 158th Fighter Interceptor Group in mid 1960 and was placed under the United States Air Defense Command. Lt Col Robert P. Goyette assumed command of the group and Maj Rolfe L. Chickering took command of the 134th Fighter Interceptor Squadron. The Air Guard now manned alert hangars 24 hours a day, a mission which had previously belonged to the active Air Force.

During the 1950s and early 1960s, better training and equipment, and closer relations with the Air Force greatly improved the readiness of Group. The Vermont Air National Guard received the ADC Operational Readiness award in October 1962, for having the greatest degree of readiness of any F-89 unit in the country.  In 1965, the 134th received Mach-2 supersonic F-102A Delta Dagger interceptors, the Air Guard was always one generation of aircraft behind the Air Force during this time.

In 1971 the 158th embarked on an intensive recruiting program that made Vermont one of the top units in the country in total strength. During this period the Vermont ANG began to actively recruit women into all open career fields. Maryanne T. Lorenz was the first woman officer and SSgt Karen Wingard left active duty with the Air Force to become the first enlisted woman to join the Green Mountain Boy unit. She later became First Sergeant of the 158th Mission Support Squadron, received her commission, and was later appointed commander of that squadron.

The 158th Fighter Interceptor Group became the 158th Defense Systems Evaluation Group (158 DSEG) in June 1974, with the unit receiving twenty EB-57 Canberras. These two-seat, twin-engine aircraft were former medium bombers that were re-equipped with electronic counter-measures and chaff emitting equipment. The new mission was to act as the "friendly enemy" to evaluate both air and ground radar systems. This mission took pilots, electronic warfare officers, and maintenance personnel all over the United States, Canada, and as far as Iceland, South Korea, and Japan. The unit provided direct operational training of now-Aerospace Defense Command, U.S. Air Forces in Europe (USAFE) and Pacific Air Forces (PACAF) aircrews in the accomplishment of their mission when their systems were severely degraded as might be expected during an attack by enemy offensive aircraft.

Tactical Air Command

With the disestablishment of Aerospace Defense Command in 1979, the 158th was subsequently transferred to Tactical Air Command (TAC) as a gaining command under Air Defense, Tactical Air Command (ADTAC), which assumed the mission of the former ADC.

In 1980, the 158th began a transition to the F-4D Phantom II, a powerful, two seat, twin-engine fighter, with the Vermont Air National Guard, leaving the Air Defense community to become part of main line Tactical Air Command with a primary mission of ground attack and close air support.

The 158th Tactical Fighter Group deployed to the Gulfport Combat Readiness Training Center, Mississippi, in January 1983 to prepare for the upcoming Operational Readiness Inspection. This was the unit's first large-scale deployment in 23 years. The last deployment had been for summer camp at Otis AFB, Massachusetts, in 1960.

The 158th Civil Engineering Squadron dedicated its new building on 14 December. Fifty-two members of the CE Squadron deployed to Panama on a humanitarian mission in January 1994. They constructed a six-room masonry block school building and a single story wood frame building to be used as a hospice by the local hospital.

In the mid eighties the USAF decided to re-equip the Air National Guard units with more modern equipment as part of the "Total Force" concept. In the earlier decades the ANG always had to be thankful to receive older USAF jets. With the introduction of the F-16 this changed.  The F-4D Phantoms were retired in 1986 and the first F-16 Fighting Falcon models of the 134th FS were of the block 15 version – although also some earlier 1970s block 1 and 10 models were flown for a brief time. These aircraft came from regular USAF squadrons who transitioned to newer F-16C/D models, but still these aircraft, largely 1982 models, were no older than a mere 5 years.

From 1989–1997, the 134th Fighter Squadron's mission was air defense, having aircraft on 5-minute alert, seven days a week, 24 hours a day. Locations of these alert aircraft included Burlington, Maine, Virginia and South Carolina.  The location of the Vermont ANG was much more specific in their relation to NORAD that they were tasked with this defense as a primary role. Therefore, the block 15 lacked the Beyond Visual Range capability. However, this changed in the course of 1990 with the upgrade of their aircraft to the block 15 ADF (Air Defense Fighter) version. This meant a serious leap in performance and capability of this squadron in their defensive role. As a result, the Vermont ANG has one of the highest rates of interceptions of Russian bombers that were coming in over the North Pole, except for some Alaskan USAF units.

Many times Vermont F-16's were called upon to fly to a point just short of Iceland and escort Soviet bombers as they flew off the coastline of the United States. The 158th FW has also assisted with aircraft experiencing in-flight malfunctions and hijackings.

Air Combat Command

F-16C (1994–2019)

In March 1992, with the end of the Cold War, the 158th adopted the Air Force Objective Organization plan, and the unit was re-designated as the 158th Fighter Group. In June, Tactical Air Command was inactivated as part of the Air Force reorganization after the end of the Cold War. It was replaced by Air Combat Command (ACC).

In 1994 the scope of the squadron was again enlarged with the introduction of the block 25 version of the F-16. The 134th FS was one of the first ANG units to receive the F-16C/D Fighting Falcon. At first the mission of the squadron remained relatively the same. But with the introduction of these aircraft a more multi-role mission profile became possible with the squadron being tasked to undertake deployments to the Middle East.

Along with the Air Defense mission, the men and women of "The Green Mountain Boys" have also been tasked seven times to deploy to different locations in Central America to help patrol the skies and intercept aircraft suspected of illegally smuggling drugs. These missions were usually flown far offshore in the middle of the night and required a high degree of proficiency.

In 1995, in accordance with the Air Force "One Base-One Wing" directive, the 158th was changed in status to a Wing, and the 134th Fighter Squadron was assigned to the new 158th Operations Group.  In mid-1996, the Air Force, in response to budget cuts, and changing world situations, began experimenting with Air Expeditionary organizations. The Air Expeditionary Force (AEF) concept was developed that would mix Active-Duty, Reserve and Air National Guard elements into a combined force. Instead of entire permanent units deploying as "Provisional" as in the 1991 Gulf War, Expeditionary units are composed of "aviation packages" from several wings, including active-duty Air Force, the Air Force Reserve Command and the Air National Guard, would be married together to carry out the assigned deployment rotation.

In the fall of 1997, the 158th Fighter Wing was evaluated by the Air Combat Command and was tasked to fight a simulated war from 2 locations, a very challenging undertaking. The 158th Wing deployed 225 personnel and 10 F-16s to Canada while the rest of the Wing remained in Burlington for the comprehensive 5-day evaluation. The men and women of "The Green Mountain Boys" received the first rating of "Outstanding" (the highest possible score) ever earned by an Air Defense Unit.

In 1998 the squadron was one of five ANG squadrons to be equipped with the Theater Airborne Reconnaissance System (TARS). This way the squadrons mission became somewhat specific in the USAF, since only these five ANG units possess a tactical reconnaissance capacity. They are therefore regularly asked to perform this mission for the entire organization.

In October 2000, the 134th Expeditionary Fighter Squadron was formed and deployed to Prince Sultan Air Base, Saudi Arabia as part of a "Rainbow" package composed of the 111th and 177th Fighter Squadron. Operation Southern Watch was an operation which was responsible for enforcing the United Nations mandated no-fly zone below the 32nd parallel north in Iraq as part of Air Expeditionary Force 9. This mission was initiated mainly to cover for attacks of Iraqi forces on the Iraqi Shi’ite Muslims.

After the terrorist attacks on 11 September 2001, the 134th began flying Operation Noble Eagle air defense missions over major cities in the northeast.

Beginning in May 2005, the 134th began a series of deployments to Balad Air Base, Iraq, being attached to the 332d Expeditionary Fighter Squadron. This was a rotation in the Air Expeditionary Force 9/10 cycle as part of another Rainbow deployment to support Operation Iraqi Freedom (OIF) along with the 119th and 163d Expeditionary Fighter Squadrons.   Another OIF Expeditionary deployment was made in February 2006 and a third to Balad AB was made in September 2007.

As a result of BRAC 2005, on 5 March 2008 – still in 186th FS markings – the 134th FS received its first F-16 block 30 (#87-0332) as the Montana ANG 186th Fighter Squadron converted to the F-15 Eagle. This conversion is not only an engine change from the Pratt & Whitney to the General Electric but also to the big inlet viper. Before the end of 2008 the 134th FS had completed its conversion to the block 30. The block 25s were sent to the Minnesota ANG 179th Fighter Squadron; the 412th Test Wing at Edwards AFB, and some went to AMARC for retirement in the 'boneyard.' The 134th achieved initial operational capability (IOC) on the block 30 in 2009 with the squadron being ready for combat.

In December 2013, the Air Force announced that the Vermont Air National Guard will be the first Air National Guard unit to operate the fifth-generation Lockheed Martin F-35A Lightning II. 18 aircraft will be delivered to the unit starting in September 2019.

The last four F-16s departed Burlington on 6 April 2019 in preparation for the arrival of the F-35A, marking an end to 33 years of Viper operations.

F-35A (2019–present)

The first two F-35As (17-5265 and 17-5266) were delivered to the 134th FS on 19 September 2019. Three more F-35As arrived at Burlington from Fort Worth, Texas, on 5 December 2019. The last of 20 F-35As to be delivered to the Green Mountain Boys arrived at Burlington in October 2020.

On 2 May 2022, eight 134th FS F-35As deployed to Spangdahlem Air Base, Germany, to support NATO's Enhanced Air Policing mission due to the 2022 Russian invasion of Ukraine. The Green Mountain Boys returned to Vermont on 3 August 2022 after being replaced by Lockheed Martin F-22A Raptors from the 90th Fighter Squadron.

Lineage
 Constituted 384th Bombardment Squadron (Light) on 28 January 1942
 Activated on 2 March 1942
 Re-designated: 384th Bombardment Squadron (Dive) on 27 July 1942
 Re-designated: 530th Fighter-Bomber Squadron on 30 September 1943
 Re-designated: 530th Fighter Squadron on 30 May 1944
 Inactivated on 16 February 1946
 Re-designated: 134th Fighter Squadron, and allotted to Vermont ANG, on 24 May 1946
 Extended federal recognition 14 August 1946
 Federalized and ordered to active service on: 10 February 1951
 Released from active duty and returned to Vermont state control, 1 November 1952
 Re-designated: 134th Fighter-Interceptor Squadron, 1 November 1952
 Re-designated: 134th Defense Systems Evaluation Squadron on 9 June 1974
 Re-designated: 134th Tactical Fighter Squadron on 1 January 1982
 Re-designated: 134th Fighter-Interceptor Squadron on 1 July 1987
 Re-designated: 134th Fighter Squadron on 15 March 1992
 Components designated as: 134th Expeditionary Fighter Squadron when deployed as part of an Air and Space Expeditionary unit after June 1996.

Assignments
 311th Bombardment (later Fighter-Bomber; Fighter) Group, 2 Mar 1942 – 6 Jan 1946
 Vermont Air National Guard, 14 August 1946
 67th Fighter Wing, 15 October 1946
 101st Fighter Group, 4 April 1947
 101st Fighter-Interceptor Wing, 10 February 1951
 Attached to: 23d Fighter-Interceptor Wing, 1 April 1951
 23d Fighter-Interceptor Wing
 Attached to: 4711th Defense Wing, 6 February 1952
 101st Fighter-Interceptor Group, 1 November 1952 – 30 June 1954
 101st Fighter-Interceptor Group, 1 July 1954 – 14 April 1956
 158th Fighter Group (Air Defense), 15 April 1956
 158th Fighter-Interceptor Group, 1 July 1960
 158th Defense Systems Evaluation Group, 9 June 1974
 158th Tactical Fighter Group, 1 January 1982
 158th Fighter-Interceptor Group, 1 July 1987
 158th Fighter Group, 15 March 1992
 158th Operations Wing, 11 October 1995 – Present

Stations

 Will Rogers Field, Oklahoma, 2 March 1942
 Hunter Field, Georgia, 4 July 1942
 Waycross Army Airfield, Georgia, 22 October 1942 – 18 July 1943
 Nawadih Airfield, India, 14 September 1943
 Dinjan Airfield, India, 18 October 1943
 Detachment operated from: Kurmitola, India, 21 Oct – Nov 1943; 28 May – 11 June 1944
 Kwanghan, China, 21 October 1944
 Detachment operated from: Hsian, China, 30 October 1944 – 21 February 1945

 Pungchacheng, China, 5 May 1945
 Hsian, China, Aug 1945
 Shanghai, China, 17 October 1945 – 16 February 1946.
 Burlington International Airport, Vermont, 1946
 Designated: Ethan Allen Air Force Base, 1953 – 1960
 Detachment 1 operated from: Bangor International Airport, Maine, 1987 – 1992
 Designated: Burlington Air National Guard Base, 1991 – present

Vermont Air National Guard Deployments
 Korean War federalization
 Operated from: Presque Isle Air Force Base, Maine, 1 April 1951 – 1 November 1952
 Operation Southern Watch (AEF)
 Operated from: Prince Sultan Air Base, Saudi Arabia, October – 15 November 2000
 Operation Iraqi Freedom (OIF)
 Operated from Balad Air Base, Iraq, May – August 2005
 Operated from Balad Air Base, Iraq, February – 20 May 2006
 Operated from Balad Air Base, Iraq, September – December 2007

Aircraft
Aircraft operated include:

 Vultee A-35B Vengeance (1942)
 North American A-36A Apache (1942 – 1944)
 North American P-51C Mustang (1944 – 1945)
 Republic F-47D Thunderbolt (1947 – 1950)
 North American F-51H Mustang (1950 – 1952)
 Lockheed T-33A Shooting Star (1953 – 198x)
 Lockheed F-94A/B Starfire (June 1953 – 1958)
 Northrop F-89D Scorpion (1958 – 1960)
 Northrop F-89J Scorpion (1960 – 1965)
 Convair F/TF-102A Delta Dagger (August 1965 – 1974)
 Martin EB-57B/E Canberra (June 1974 – 1982)
 McDonnell Douglas F-4D Phantom II (1980 – 1986)
 General Dynamics F-16A/B Block 15 Fighting Falcon (1986 – 1990)
 General Dynamics F-16A/B Block 15 ADF Fighting Falcon (1990 – 1994)
 General Dynamics F-16C/D Block 25 Fighting Falcon (1994 – 2008)
 General Dynamics F-16C/D Block 30 Fighting Falcon (March 2008 – April 2019)
Lockheed Martin F-35A Lightning II (September 2019 – present)

References

Notes
 Explanatory notes

 Citations

Bibliography

 
 
 
 134th Fighter Squadron lineage and history
 158th Fighter Wing History

Squadrons of the United States Air National Guard
Fighter squadrons of the United States Air Force
Military units and formations in Vermont
Military units and formations established in 1946
Vermont National Guard